The 1983–84 Divizia A was the sixty-sixth season of Divizia A, the top-level football league of Romania.

Teams

League table

Results

Top goalscorers

Champion squad

See also 

 1983–84 Divizia B

References

Liga I seasons
Romania
1983–84 in Romanian football